Husynne  is a village in the administrative district of Gmina Hrubieszów, within Hrubieszów County, Lublin Voivodeship, in eastern Poland, close to the border with Ukraine.

The village has a population of 527.

See also 
 Battle of Husynne

References

Villages in Hrubieszów County
Lublin Governorate
Kholm Governorate
Lublin Voivodeship (1919–1939)